The Greystone Preparatory School Program situated on the campus of the University of the Ozarks in  Clarksville, AR serves to prepare candidates for nomination, appointment and success at one of the five U.S Federal Service Academies: 
  United States Air Force Academy
  United States Naval Academy
  United States Military Academy
  United States Merchant Marine Academy
  United States Coast Guard Academy

The Greystone program was started by Commander David Bailey, U.S. Navy (Ret.), a graduate of the U.S. Naval Academy - Class of 1981. The Greystone program began operation as the newest and most unique service academy preparatory school in 2004, largely due to its university affiliation unlike many other programs of its kind.  Greystone's mission is simple: Empower young men and women to earn their appointment to the service academy of their choice. It focuses on preparing candidates academically, physically, and as leaders. While enrolled at Greystone, students are co-enrolled at The University of the Ozarks, taking an average of 19 credit hours per semester with classes commensurate with an academic course load served at the service academies.

Since the founding of Greystone in 2004, a very high percentage of students have received formal congressional/senatorial nominations to their respective academies and approximately 84% of students have earned their final appointments.

References

Education in Kerr County, Texas